Stanley S. Ballard (1908–1998) was an American physicist, specializing in optics. He was president of the Optical Society of America in 1963 and of the American Association of Physics Teachers during 1968–69. In 1986 he was awarded the Oersted Medal. During World War II, Ballard served as a Commander in the United States Navy.
From 1956 to 1959 he was the President of the International Commission for Optics.

Ballard obtained his Ph.D and M.Sc. in physics from the University of California, Berkeley, and his undergraduate degree from Pomona College. He served on the faculties of several physics departments, including as chairman at Tufts University and the University of Florida.

In 1954 he coauthored Physics Principles (with Edgar P. Slack and Erich Hausmann)

In 1964 The Commission on College Physics published Polarized Light that he wrote with William Shurcliff. A reviewer noted the "straightforward, conversational style" and that "The treatment is mostly non-mathematical but touches on electromagnetic theory, the Poincaré sphere, Stokes vectors and Mueller matrices with great clarity."

See also
Optical Society of America#Past Presidents of the OSA

References

1908 births
1998 deaths
Presidents of Optica (society)
20th-century American physicists
Optical physicists
United States Navy officers
Pomona College alumni
UC Berkeley College of Letters and Science alumni
University of California, Berkeley faculty
Tufts University faculty
University of Florida faculty
University of Arizona faculty
Dartmouth College faculty
American textbook writers
Military personnel from California